The discography of Jim Jones, an American hip hop recording artist, consists of seven studio albums, three collaborative albums, two compilation albums, two extended plays (EPs), nineteen mixtapes and 45 singles (including 17 as a featured artist). Jones is perhaps best known for being a member of East Coast hip hop group The Diplomats (also known as Dipset), with whom he recorded several mixtapes with before releasing their debut album Diplomatic Immunity, in 2003. In August 2004, Jones released his solo debut album On My Way to Church, under Diplomat Records and E1 Music (formerly Koch Records). The album was preceded by the release of the singles "Certified Gangstas" and "Crunk Muzik", the latter of which features his Dipset-cohorts Juelz Santana and Cam'ron, and also supported the release of Dipset's second album Diplomatic Immunity 2 (2004).

In August 2005, Jones followed up with his second album Harlem: Diary of a Summer, which spawned the singles "Baby Girl" (featuring Max B), "Summer wit Miami" (featuring Trey Songz) and "What You Been Drankin On?" (featuring P. Diddy, Paul Wall and Jha Jha). In 2006, Jones released his most successful album to date, Hustler's P.O.M.E. (Product of My Environment). The album, which charted at number six on the US Billboard 200 chart, features his biggest hit single to date. The song, titled "We Fly High", reached number five on the US Billboard Hot 100 chart and was certified platinum by the Recording Industry Association of America (RIAA). In December 2006, Jones released a Christmas-themed compilation album titled A Dipset X-Mas. The album includes the popular remix to "We Fly High", which features verses from fellow American rappers T.I., Diddy, Juelz Santana, Birdman, Jermaine Dupri and Young Dro.

After releasing several mixtapes for free online, Jones chose to release his eighth mixtape, titled Harlem's American Gangster, for retail. The album was supported by the singles "Looking At the Game", featuring now-deceased rapper Stack Bundles and "Love Me No More". Jones later teamed up with his hip hop group ByrdGang, which he founded in 2006, to release their debut album M.O.B.: The Album, in July 2008. In November 2008, Jones released a second Christmas compilation, titled A Tribute to Bad Santa Starring Mike Epps, in collaboration with Juelz Santana's hip hop group Skull Gang.

In March 2009, Jones released his first major label album, Pray IV Reign, under Columbia Records. The album's lead single, titled "Pop Champagne", features vocals from Juelz Santana and the song's producer Ron Browz. "Pop Champagne" reached number 22 on the US Billboard Hot 100 chart and was certified gold by the RIAA. In October 2009, Jones collaborated with fellow New York City-based rapper DJ Webstar, to release an album titled The Rooftop, which includes the single "Dancin on Me". After releasing several mixtapes, Jones released his fifth album Capo in April 2011, which spawned the singles "Perfect Day" and "Everybody Jones". On October 31, 2011, Jones released a mixtape titled Vampire Life: We Own the Night. He went on to release two more installments of his Vampire Life series, before releasing an EP titled We Own the Night, in a reboot of the series. The EP was supported by the single "Nasty Girl", featuring Jeremih and DJ Spinking. On September 9, 2014, he released the EP We Own the Night Pt. 2: Memoirs of a Hustler.

Solo studio albums

Collaborative albums

Compilation albums

EPs

Mixtapes

Singles

As lead artist

As featured artist

Guest appearances

See also 
The Diplomats discography

ByrdGang discography

Singles

Notes

References

External links
 
 
 

Hip hop discographies
 
 
Discographies of American artists